The men's 200 metres event at the 2004 African Championships in Athletics was held in Brazzaville, Republic of the Congo on July 16–18.

Medalists

Results

Heats
Wind:Heat 1: -2.1 m/s, Heat 2: +0.9 m/s, Heat 3: -1.1 m/s, Heat 4: -2.7 m/s, Heat 5: -2.1 m/s, Heat 6: -1.8 m/s

Semifinals
Wind:Heat 1: -0.7 m/s, Heat 2: +0.6 m/s

Final
Wind: 0.0 m/s

References
Results

2004 African Championships in Athletics
200 metres at the African Championships in Athletics